Nélisse is a surname. Notable people with the surname include:

Isabelle Nélisse (born 2003), Canadian actress, sister of Sophie
Robin Nelisse (born 1978),  Netherlands Antillean footballer
Sophie Nélisse (born 2000), Canadian actress, sister of Isabelle

See also
Nelissen